Edward Freeman (7 November 1848 – 11 August 1905) was an Australian cricketer. He played one first-class match for Tasmania in 1872.

See also
 List of Tasmanian representative cricketers

References

External links
 

1848 births
1905 deaths
Australian cricketers
Tasmania cricketers
Cricketers from Hobart